The Idiot Returns is a 1999 Czech film directed by Saša Gedeon. The movie is loosely based on The Idiot by Fyodor Dostoevsky. It was the Czech Republic's submission to the 72nd Academy Awards for the Academy Award for Best Foreign Language Film, but was not accepted as a nominee.

Plot
František returns from a mental institution where he spent most of his life. He meets Anna, and later her lovers Emil and Robert, and her sister Olga.

Cast 
 Pavel Liška as František
 Anna Geislerová as Anna
 Tatiana Vilhelmová as Olga
 Jiří Langmajer as Emil
 Jiří Macháček as Robert
 Zdena Hadrbolcová as Emil's and Robert's mother
 Jitka Smutná as Anna and Olga's mother
 Pavel Marek as Krtek
 Anna Polívková as Girl at dancing lessons

Awards
 1999 Czech Lion Award for Best Film
 1999 Czech Lion Award for Best Screenplay - Saša Gedeon
 1999 Czech Lion Award for Best Director - Saša Gedeon
 1999 Czech Lion Award for Best Supporting Actress - Anna Geislerová
 1999 Czech Lion Award for Best Music - Vladimír Godár
 2000 Best Actress at Buenos Aires International Festival of Independent Cinema - Anna Geislerová and Tatiana Vilhelmová
 2000 Best Screenplay at Buenos Aires International Festival of Independent Cinema - Saša Gedeon
 1999 International Jury Award at São Paulo International Film Festival - Saša Gedeon

See also
 List of submissions to the 72nd Academy Awards for Best Foreign Language Film
 List of Czech submissions for the Academy Award for Best Foreign Language Film

References

External links

1999 films
1999 romance films
Films based on The Idiot
Czech romantic films
Czech Lion Awards winners (films)
Golden Kingfisher winners
Stillking Films films
1990s Czech-language films